The 65th British Academy Film Awards, more commonly known as the BAFTAs, were held on 12 February 2012 at the Royal Opera House in London, honouring the best national and foreign films of 2011. The nominations were announced on 17 January 2012 by actor Daniel Radcliffe and actress Holliday Grainger. Presented by the British Academy of Film and Television Arts, accolades are handed out for the best feature-length film and documentaries of any nationality that were screened at British cinemas in 2011. Stephen Fry, who hosted from 2001 to 2006, returned to host the ceremony. The Artist won seven awards out of its twelve nominations, including Best Film, Best Director for Michel Hazanavicius, and Best Actor for Jean Dujardin. Meryl Streep won Best Actress for The Iron Lady. Christopher Plummer won Best Supporting Actor for Beginners and Octavia Spencer won Best Supporting Actress for The Help. Tinker Tailor Soldier Spy, directed by Tomas Alfredson, was voted Outstanding British Film of 2011. Director Martin Scorsese was given the BAFTA Fellowship and Sir John Hurt garnered the BAFTA Outstanding British Contribution to Cinema Award.

Winners and nominees

BAFTA Fellowship
 Martin Scorsese

Outstanding British Contribution to Cinema
 Sir John Hurt

Statistics

In Memoriam

Jane Russell
Bingham Ray
Michael Gough
Richard Leacock
Shammi Kapoor
Ken Russell
Syd Cain
Eva Monley
Nicol Williamson
Whitney Houston
Theodoros Angelopoulos
Laura Ziskin
Arthur Laurents
Hugh Martin
Richard Pointing
Ben Gazzara
Shelagh Delaney
Bubba Smith
Steve Jobs
Sidney Lumet
Farley Granger
John Mackenzie
Michael Cacoyannis
John Calley
Bridget O'Connor
Elizabeth Taylor

See also
 1st AACTA International Awards
 84th Academy Awards
 37th César Awards
 17th Critics' Choice Awards
 64th Directors Guild of America Awards
 25th European Film Awards
 69th Golden Globe Awards
 32nd Golden Raspberry Awards
 26th Goya Awards
 27th Independent Spirit Awards
 17th Lumières Awards
 2nd Magritte Awards
 23rd Producers Guild of America Awards
 16th Satellite Awards
 38th Saturn Awards
 18th Screen Actors Guild Awards
 64th Writers Guild of America Awards

References

External links
 65th BAFTA Awards page

Film065
2012 awards in the United Kingdom
2011 film awards
2012 in London
2012 in British cinema
Royal Opera House
February 2012 events in the United Kingdom